Ernst Bergmann (7 August 1881 – 16 April 1945) was a German philosopher. In the early 1930s, he was known as the most famous German opponent of patriarchy, and after 1933, Bergmann became a leading proponent of a new pagan German religion ("Deutschreligion", later called "Gemeinschaft Deutsche Volksreligion").

Biography
Ernst Bergmann was the son of Lutheran pastor Ernst Albin Bergmann (1838–1894) and Swiss-born Marie Louise Linder (1846–1934), he studied philosophy and German philology at the University of Leipzig and got his PhD in 1905. Subsequently, he continued his studies in Berlin. Later he returned to Leipzig, where he received the status of Privatdozent at the university in 1911. In 1916 he was awarded the position of Ausserordentlicher Professor (professor without chair). In 1917, he married Gertrud Landsberg, daughter of a Jewish family from Posen. They became parents of two sons: Ulrich (1918–1940) and Dieter (1920–1995). Ulrich died in battle as a soldier of the Wehrmacht, Dieter became a physician and emigrated to the USA. In 1995, Dieter published a memoir, which is an important source for his father's biography. The marriage ended in divorce in 1925.

Ernst Bergmann's philosophical works comprise a lot of different areas. During his early years before World War I, he was a noted expert on the philosophy of French philosopher Jean-Marie Guyau, after that he became a well-known German "Neofichteaner", with works on the philosophy of German philosopher Johann Gottlieb Fichte and on the history of German thought. Although Bergmann joined the National Socialist German Workers Party in 1930, he published in 1932 a book about the dangers and the harmfulness of patriarchy that ran contrary to the leading Nazi ideology ("Erkenntnisgeist und Muttergeist. Eine Soziosophie der Geschlechter"). After Hitler had become German Chancellor in 1933, Bergmann nevertheless hoped that the new regime would bring a cultural revolution, especially in the area of religion and philosophy. Bergmann was strongly opposed to both Christianity and Judaism and propagated a new kind of religiosity ("Deutschreligion") based on his own philosophy and the pre-Christian spiritual roots of the German people. His works during the Nazi area concentrated on religious and philosophical topics. In the years of World War II, Bergmann became alienated from the Hitler regime and was excluded from the NSDAP in 1943.

Works and ideology 
His works Die deutsche Nationalkirche (the German National Church) and Die natürliche Geistlehre (The Natural Doctrine of the Spirit) were placed on the Index Librorum Prohibitorum, the Roman Catholic list of banned books, in 1934 and 1937.

In his pagan manifesto Die 25 Thesen der Deutschreligion (Twenty-five Points of the German Religion), Bergmann held that both the Old Testament and the New Testament of the Bible were unsuitable for use in Germany. He was not interested in creating an "Aryan" version of Christianity or an "Aryan" Jesus, but emphasized the necessity of founding a new non-Christian belief and a non-Christian church ("Deutsche Nationalkirche") for the German people.

Heart attack and death 
In the winter of either 1944 or 1945, Bergmann suffered a heart attack, and in April 1945 he died, according to the memoir of his son Dieter, due to his severe heart problems.

Works
 Erkenntnisgeist und Muttergeist. Eine Soziosophie der Geschlechter, 1932.
 Die Deutsche Nationalkirche, 1933.
 Deutschland, das Bildungsland der neuen Menschheit. Eine nationalsozialistische Kulturphilosophie, 1933.
 Die 25 Thesen der Deutschreligion. Ein Katechismus, 1934.
 Die natürliche Geistlehre. System einer deutsch nordischen Weltsinndeutung, 1937.
 Kleines System der Deutschen Volksreligion, 1941.

Secondary Literature
   Karl-Heinrich Hunsche: Ernst Bergmann. Sein Leben und Werk, 1936.
   W. Dieter Bergman: Between Two Benches. Not Subject to Extermination, 1995.

See also

Glossary of Nazi Germany
List of Nazi Party leaders and officials

Notes

1881 births
1945 deaths
People from Colditz
People from the Kingdom of Saxony
Nazi propagandists
German male writers
Fascist writers
20th-century German philosophers
German modern pagans
Modern pagan philosophers